The 1986 Lamar Cardinals football team represented Lamar University in the 1986 NCAA Division I-AA football season as a member of the Southland Conference.  The Cardinals played their home games at Cardinal Stadium now named Provost Umphrey Stadium in Beaumont, Texas.  Lamar finished the 1986 season with a 2–9 overall record and a 0–5 conference record.  The season marked the first year with Ray Alborn as Lamar Cardinals head football coach.  The 1986 season was also the Cardinals' last season as a member of the Southland Conference in football until the 2010 season.  Lamar joined the non–football American South Conference as a charter member along with fellow SLC members, Louisiana Tech and Arkansas State and three other universities.

Schedule

References

Lamar
Lamar Cardinals football seasons
Lamar Cardinals football